Josh Smith (5 October 1877 – 28 February 1954) was a British track and field athlete.  He competed in the 1908 Summer Olympics in London.  As a member of the upper class, he attended University of Cambridge, with ambitions to move to Liverpool.  He only spent one year in college before dropping out and residing right outside the city of Cambridge, where he became interested in running.

In the 1500 metres, Smith placed fifth in his initial semifinal heat and did not advance to the final.

References

External links
 
 
 
 

1877 births
1954 deaths
Athletes (track and field) at the 1908 Summer Olympics
Olympic athletes of Great Britain
British male long-distance runners
British male middle-distance runners